3 Days to Go is a 2019 South African Indian drama film written and directed by producer Bianca Isaac on her directorial debut. The film stars Bollywood actress Lillete Dubey, Kajal Bagwandeen, Leeanda Reddy in the lead roles. The film was set in Durban and had its theatrical release on 25 January 2019.

Synopsis 
When their father passes away, four grown siblings Melissa (Jailoshini Naidoo), Janet (Leeanda Reddy), Riki (Rahul Brijnath) and Amy (Kajal Bagwandeen) all come together and gather with their collection of husbands, wives, children and grandchildren. The family together needs to survive for 3 days under one roof before they bury their father's ashes and part ways again.

Cast 

 Leeanda Reddy as Janet
 Kajal Bagwandeen as Amy
 Rahul Brijnath as Riki
 Jailoshini Naidoo as Melissa
 Shahir Chundra as Roy
 Lillete Dubey as Matriarch Lakshmi Isaac
 Pranesh Maharaj as Calvin
 Ashish Gangapersad as Jay
 Zakeeya Patel as Candice
 Jonathan Boynton-Lee

References 

6. ^A heartwarming film with universal appeal [by Clinton Marius] http://news.artsmart.co.za/2019/01/3-days-to-go.html

7. ^ A roller-coaster of family turmoil & perfect pacing with gorgeous cinematography [by Alfonzo Words] http://www.alfonzowords.co.za/movie-review-3-days-to-go/

8. ^No family is perfect - Can it get any more relatable? [Life by Asha Singh] http://www.lifebyashasingh.com/2019/01/3-days-to-go-movie-review.html

External links 

 

2019 films
2019 drama films
2010s English-language films
English-language South African films
Films set in South Africa
South African Indian films
South African drama films
2019 directorial debut films